Al Masry Club Stadium, formerly known as Port Said Stadium, was a multi-use all-seated stadium in Al Manakh, Port Said, Egypt, which was mostly used for football and was the home of Al Masry between 1958 and 2012. The stadium, which had a seating capacity of 18,000, was opened on 16 October 1955.

In 2021, the stadium was closed, and on 4 July the demolition process began and was completed by early 2022. It will be replaced by a new stadium in the same location under the same name.

Port Said Stadium riot
On 1 February 2012, following a league match between Al Masry and Al Ahly, the Port Said Stadium riot took place, which resulted in the deaths of 72 Al Ahly fans, alongside 1 Al Masry supporter and 1 police officer, making it the deadliest tragedy in Egyptian sporting history. Some were stabbed and clubbed, while others were thrown off the stands or died in a crowd crush as they were trying to escape through a closed stadium gate in the back of the stands. Hisham Sheha, an official in the Egyptian health ministry, said the deaths were caused by stab wounds, brain hemorrhages, and concussions. Over 500 were injured.

The stadium was banned from hosting any official football matches as a result, with an exception made in 2018 when the stadium hosted all Al Masry home fixtures in their CAF Confederation Cup campaigns during the 2018 and 2018–19 seasons. The last official match hosted by the stadium was played on 15 December 2018.

Later history
In late 2019, the stadium was closed to prepare for demolition process, which was originally scheduled to take place in 2020, but was postponed due to the COVID-19 pandemic in Egypt. More than one year later, demolition work finally began on 4 July 2021. 

Previously, the stadium was owned by the Governorate of Port Said, and was known as Port Said Stadium, until 5 January 2016 when Port Said governor Adel El Ghadban agreed to transfer the stadium's ownership to Al Masry and changing its name to Al Masry Club Stadium as a result. The stadium also hosted some matches in tournaments held in Egypt, including 1997 FIFA U-17 World Championship, 2006 Africa Cup of Nations, 2007 Pan Arab Games Football Tournament and 2009 FIFA U-20 World Cup.

References

External links
 Photos at worldstadiums.com

Football venues in Egypt
Egypt
Port Said
Sport in Port Said
Sports venues completed in 1955
1955 establishments in Egypt
2021 disestablishments in Egypt
Defunct football venues in Egypt
Sports venues demolished in 2021